A second-order stimulus is a form of visual stimulus used in psychophysics in which objects are delineated from their backgrounds by differences of contrast or texture. On the contrary, a stimulus defined by differences in luminance is known as a first-order stimulus.

See also
Julesz conjecture

Psychophysics